Prince Albert—Churchill River  was a federal electoral district in the province of Saskatchewan, Canada, that was represented in the House of Commons of Canada from 1988 to 1997.

This riding was created in 1987 from parts of Mackenzie, Prince Albert, and The Battlefords—Meadow Lake ridings.

Prince Albert—Churchill River consisted of the northern portion of the Province of Saskatchewan.

The electoral district was abolished in 1996 when it was redistributed into Churchill River, Prince Albert and Wanuskewin ridings.

Electoral history

See also 

 List of Canadian federal electoral districts
 Past Canadian electoral districts

External links 
 

Former federal electoral districts of Saskatchewan
Constituencies disestablished in 1996